Caprica is an American science fiction drama television series. A spin-off prequel of the re-imagined Battlestar Galactica (2004), Caprica is set 58 years before the main series. Caprica shows how humanity first created the Cylon androids who would later turn against their human masters. Among Caprica'''s main characters are the father and uncle of William Adama, the man who becomes the senior surviving military leader of the fleet which represents the remnants of the Twelve Colonies in Battlestar Galactica.

An extended version of the pilot premiered exclusively on DVD and digital download on April 21, 2009. The first season debuted on January 22, 2010, on Syfy in the U.S., Space in Canada, and Sky1 in the UK, running nine episodes, including the two-hour pilot, before going on a mid-season hiatus. The second half of the first season (Season 1.5) began airing on October 5, 2010, on Syfy and Space.

On October 27, 2010, Syfy canceled the show, citing low ratings, and pulled the remaining five episodes of the series from its broadcast schedule. The series continued to air as scheduled on Space, finishing with the series finale on November 30, 2010. The remaining episodes were released on DVD in the U.S. on December 21, 2010 and aired on Syfy in a burn off marathon on January 4, 2011.

Plot
Caprica is set before cataclysmic destruction of the Twelve Colonies of Kobol, focusing on the planet Caprica, the main planet of the Twelve Colonies. Caprica is the governmental seat of the Twelve Colonies, having also become the de facto seat of culture, art, science, and learning; the language of Caprica has become the standard language of the Twelve Colonies. 

The Twelve Colonies are at peace, 58 years before the events of the 2004 television series, when an act of religious fanaticism brings together Joseph Adama, a lawyer with ties to the criminal underworld, and wealthy technologist Daniel Graystone, both of whom lost family members. Grief-stricken by the loss of his daughter and fueled by obsession, Daniel sets out to bring her back, using his considerable wealth and sprawling technology corporation. Offered the chance of his own daughter being restored, Joseph wrestles with the notion until he comes face to face with its reality.

Production

ConceptCaprica differs significantly from its parent series. Ronald D. Moore had strong feelings on the matter, explaining his position that "...you don't try to repeat the formula," and going on to say, "...everything about Caprica was designed specifically to not repeat what we had done in Galactica." Although a critical success, Galactica had a predominantly male audience, and both Moore and the network felt the "war in space" backdrop was a major deterrent to female viewers. With these considerations, and Caprica's storyline already focused on events taking place prior to the two Cylon Wars, the series has a different tone, content, and style. While Caprica contains references to elements of the Battlestar universe, the series was intended to be accessible to new fans.

 Outline 
Whereas the dark, post-apocalyptic reimagined Battlestar Galactica series revolved around a final struggle for survival, Caprica is concerned with a world intoxicated by success. Ronald D. Moore states: "It's about a society that's running out of control with a wild-eyed glint in its eye." The Twelve Colonies are at their peak: self-involved, oblivious, and mesmerized by the seemingly unlimited promise of technology. Framed by the conflict between the Adamas and the Graystones over the resurrection of loved ones lost in an act of terrorism, the series was meant to explore ethical implications of advances in artificial intelligence and robotics.Caprica is grounded in urban locales rather than in space, and focuses on corporate, political, familial, and personal intrigue, similar in approach to a Greek tragedy. With wealth, corporate intrigue, and the troubled relationship between two families at its center, Moore himself has likened Caprica to the 1980s prime time soap opera Dallas, Like Battlestar Galactica, Caprica had a story arc format.

Development
During the second season of Battlestar Galactica, series developer Ronald D. Moore and production partner David Eick started speculating about the Battlestar Galactica universe prior to the Cylons. Unable to dedicate serious time to the notion, it remained in the concept stage of development until in early 2006, screenwriter Remi Aubuchon, unaware of the ideas about a Battlestar Galactica prequel, proposed a film about artificial intelligence to Universal Pictures. Though Universal Pictures turned down the project as a movie, Universal Television executives felt Moore and Eick might be interested in Aubuchon's take on the subject and arranged a meeting. Merging the existing thoughts for a Battlestar Galactica prequel with those Aubuchon brought to the table, a general outline for a series emerged.

While the Sci-Fi Channel management was enthusiastic about the idea, they had been engaged in a struggle with Moore about Battlestar Galacticas long storylines, which the network felt kept new viewers from joining. Although Moore's subsequent retooling garnered negative criticism from fans and press alike, and the Sci-Fi Channel eventually admitted that standalone episodes did not work for the show, the network balked at the prospect of another series with a story-arc-heavy format and Caprica got stuck in "development hell".

With Eick and Moore's announcement that Battlestar Galactica was going to end with its fourth season, and after a drawn out pre-development cycle, on March 18, 2008, the Sci-Fi Channel announced that Caprica had been picked up as a two-hour backdoor pilot event, indicating a possible commitment to a series, contingent on ratings. On July 20 of the same year, Sci-Fi announced it was considering picking up Caprica directly as a weekly series, and would make the pilot an extended season premiere. Finally, on December 2, Sci-Fi gave the go-ahead to expand the project into a full series. Production was resumed in July 2009 for an anticipated series premiere in early 2010. The series premiered on January 22, 2010.

Company and crew
Universal Media Studios developed the show, in conjunction with Remi Aubuchon and the executive producers of Battlestar Galactica, Ronald D. Moore and David Eick. Aubuchon co-created the show and worked on the pilot, then left to become executive producer of Persons Unknown. The pilot was directed by Friday Night Lights veteran Jeffrey Reiner. Battlestar Galactica's Jane Espenson, Michael Taylor, and Ryan Mottesheard, Pushing Daisies' Kath Lingenfelter, and Friday Night Lights Patrick Massett and John Zinman joined the writing staff. Moore ran the writers room initially, but handed off to Espenson, who was promoted to executive producer and was Caprica'''s showrunner until November 15, 2009, when it was announced that Kevin Murphy, who had joined as executive producer in October, would assume the role.

Cast and characters

Eric Stoltz received the script while filming a movie, and he left it in his hotel room for several days without reading it. When it was stolen by a maid who had been paid off by a Battlestar fan, he realized how passionate the fandom was, and knew he had to read it. Paula Malcomson originally tested for the role of Sister Clarice Willow; however, Jeffrey Reiner felt she would make a great Amanda Graystone. On April 28, 2009, Sasha Roiz's role was expanded to full series regular. Brian Markinson was also upgraded from guest star to series regular after the pilot episode.

 Eric Stoltz as Daniel Graystone – Husband of Amanda and father of Zoe
 Esai Morales as Joseph Adama – Father of William and Tamara
 Paula Malcomson as Amanda Graystone – Wife of Daniel and mother of Zoe
 Alessandra Torresani as Zoe Graystone – Daughter of Daniel and Amanda
 Magda Apanowicz as Lacy Rand – Zoe's best friend
 Sasha Roiz as Sam Adama – Brother of Joseph
 Brian Markinson as Jordan Duram – An agent for the Global Defense Department
 Polly Walker as Sister Clarice Willow – Headmistress at Athena Academy

Location
The show was shot in and around Vancouver, British Columbia. In the pilot, exterior shots feature many regional landmarks, often augmented using CG imagery. Many of the external scenes were filmed in the Yaletown area of the city, including one distinctive shot of the old railway turntable next to the Roundhouse at Davie and Pacific. The city's library is also featured in one shot (when Daniel and Joseph meet for the first time), just as it was in scenes set in Caprica City in various episodes of Battlestar Galactica.

Vancouver's SkyTrain and one of its stations (Granville) feature in the sequence prior to the terrorist explosion. The production chose to keep the same font and sign style used by the real SkyTrain, but with rebadged signs featuring the name "Caprica City". Several structures found in the financial district of Dubai, United Arab Emirates, have been digitally added to the images of Caprica City to enhance its futuristic look, including one of the Emirates Towers, the Khalifa Tower, and the Dubai Metro.

The exterior shots of the school attended by Zoe Graystone, Lacy Rand and several other characters were filmed outside the Vancouver School of Theology, on the campus of the University of British Columbia.

When Daniel takes Joseph and William to the Pyramid sports match, the colors of Caprica's team (the Buccaneers) are identical to those of Vancouver's real life hockey team, the Canucks. Navy and green stripes adorn the walls outside the team dressing room, suggesting that the scenes were filmed at Rogers Arena.

One of the encounters between Daniel Graystone and Tomas Vergis was filmed in the University of British Columbia's Museum of Anthropology. The sculpture "The Raven and the First Men" was in the background.

There was also significant filming at Central City Shopping Centre in Surrey, B.C., and much of the Simon Fraser University Surrey Campus was transformed to represent various locations in Caprica. For instance, the mezzanine and registrar's office at SFU were used to represent the Caprica Inter-colonial Space Port.

The interior shots of Graystone Industries were almost exclusively filmed at BCIT's Aerospace Technology Campus in Richmond, B.C.

The filming of "Little Tauron" was done in and around Vancouver's Chinatown district with a small number of stores in the area having Greek language signs (ancient and modern Greek was used as the language of the Taurons in Caprica) while the rest of the shops retained their Chinese language signs for the duration of the filming.

Music

Bear McCreary served as the composer for Caprica. His soundtrack for the show was almost entirely orchestral. As on Battlestar Galactica, character themes are used extensively; however, world ethnic influences play a much smaller role. The full ethnic percussion ensemble, including taiko, frame drums, dumbeks, chang changs, tsuzumis and other instruments, was brought in, although used much more sparingly than on Battlestar. The "Tauron Theme" draws inspiration from Russian folk music.

Todd Fancey, best known as a long-time member of the popular indie band New Pornographers, composed "V-Club", a rhythm-intensive track that serves as the theme music for club scenes in the series. This theme was featured prominently in the first preview clip for the new series.

The soundtrack for the Caprica pilot was released on June 16, 2009, by La-La Land Records, and contains 18 tracks. On July 30, 2013, La-La Land Records released a follow-up compilation of music from across the first (and only) season of the show.

 Episodes 

ReceptionCaprica received generally positive reviews.Home Media Magazine's John Latchem wrote that Caprica has "all the same dark overtones and richness of character that fans have come to expect from Galactica." He also wrote that the show "[evokes] a feeling similar to Gattaca in its depiction of a potential near future, while infusing elements of the Matrix and Terminator movies to set up a bridge to the events viewers know will unfold."The Futon Critic's Brian Ford Sullivan found the first fifteen minutes "A weird mix of teen angst, hedonism and virtual reality ... once established, the world of Caprica has the potential to be just as compelling, interesting and multi faceted as its "sequel" – minus of course the cool stuff blowing up in space. In just 92 minutes, Caprica manages to dish out a surprisingly dense, but not too overwhelming, array of plot threads."

Rob Owen of the Pittsburgh Post-Gazette gave the pilot four out of four stars, stating, "Caprica gives a more forceful, potential-filled first impression than the Battlestar Galactica pilot/miniseries." The Star-Ledger's Alan Sepinwall found the story intriguing, and Stoltz's and Morales's performances excellent, while director Jeffrey Reiner "creates an absolutely gorgeous looking pilot episode."

Joanna Weiss of The Boston Globe wrote that "if this episode is any indication, Caprica will be sinister [and] compelling" and "while the technology is inventive, human emotion still drives the plot." Mark A. Perigard of Boston Herald gave it a B+, stating that the pilot felt more like an intellectual puzzle and lacked the life-or-death intensity of Battlestar Galactica. Lewis Wallace of Wired News rated the pilot an 8/10, saying that Caprica has inherited from Battlestar "the lean writing, the strong acting, the exceptional soundtrack by Bear McCreary", and that "the characters are richly drawn and ripe for further exploration."

Maureen Ryan of Chicago Tribune gave it 3.5 out of 4 stars, with particular praise for the casting of Stoltz, Morales, Malcomson, and Walker. The A.V. Club's Noel Murray said of the show, "Some BSG stalwarts may have some difficulty with the muted science fiction/action elements, but it's a lovely piece of work on its own merits, imbued with real visual poetry by director Jeffrey Reiner."

Ken Tucker from Entertainment Weekly called Caprica "One of the 10 Best Shows on Now", in March 2010.The New York Times Mike Hale described Caprica as "the child of Galactica" that "hasn't yet developed enough humor or authentic domestic drama" to reach beyond Battlestar Galacticas fan base. Hale concluded that, compared to its predecessor, "Caprica is, almost by default, a more ordinary show."

Metacritic listed the show as having a score of 72 from critics, indicating "Generally favorable reviews."

The series earned generally modest ratings, peaking with 1.6 million viewers for the mid-season finale. Season 1.5 debuted with lower ratings, drawing fewer than 900,000 viewers for each episode. Citing these low ratings, Syfy canceled the program on October 27, 2010, and removed the remaining five episodes of the series from its broadcast schedule. The remaining five episodes aired as previously scheduled on Space in Canada, but were not broadcast in the United States until January 4, 2011.

In January 2011, props for the series were auctioned off on eBay.

Awards

Distribution
The rights to broadcast the series were picked up by Sky1 in the United Kingdom and Ireland, and Space in Canada. Caprica commenced airing in Australia on free-to-air digital channel 7mate on September 30, 2010.

Home media
On April 21, 2009, an uncut and unrated extended version of the pilot was released as a download from online digital media stores and as a complete DVD with commentary, deleted scenes, and video blogs.

The first half of the first season ("Season 1.0") was released on DVD in region 1 on October 5, 2010, and the second half of the season ("Season 1.5") was released on December 21, 2010.

The complete series was released on Blu-ray in France on October 25, 2011. The Region B Blu-ray set is presented in 1080p (the referenced page is incorrect, see their own back cover image) and contains all 18 episodes aired and a selection of bonus features. The set features an English DTS HD Master Audio 5.1 track as well as an English and French Audio 3D one, and comes with English and French subtitles. The series was also released on Blu-ray in Germany and Scandinavia in 2015, and in the UK as part of the Battlestar Galactica – Ultimate Collection boxed set.

References

External links
 
 Caprica at Battlestar Wiki

2010s American science fiction television series
2010s American drama television series
2010 American television series debuts
2010 American television series endings
American prequel television series
American television spin-offs
Battlestar Galactica
English-language television shows
Gay-related television shows
Serial drama television series
Syfy original programming
Television films as pilots
Television series by Universal Content Productions
Television shows filmed in Vancouver
Television shows about virtual reality
Artificial intelligence in fiction
Fiction about consciousness transfer
Retrofuturism